A number of ships were named President Garfield, including:

 
 

Ship names